Kamień Mały may refer to the following places:
Kamień Mały, Lubusz Voivodeship (west Poland)
Kamień Mały, Masovian Voivodeship (east-central Poland)
Kamień Mały, Warmian-Masurian Voivodeship (north Poland)